The siege of Soissons which took place from September 11 to October 16, 1870, was an episode of the Franco-Prussian War of which ended with the surrender of the city.

Background
Soissons had already fallen to the Prussians in 1814 during the Napoleonic Wars. After the Battle of Sedan , the Maas Group of Germany has continued on in its way to Paris , and the money infantry of Corps No. IV of Prussia, a portion of the general Army Group, this came before the siege of the fortress Soissons on September 11, 1870. The Soissons defended the city and rejected Major von Wittich's offer to withdraw from the German General Staff. The topography of the area suggested that to lay siege to the fortress, the Germans needed to be well prepared. As the advance to Paris needed to be expedited, the formations of the Prussian IV Corps were ordered out of the area for the time being, and Soissons was placed under German supervision until the General. On September 6, the bridges that connected to Villeneuve-Saint-Germain , Saint-Mard , Missy-sur-Aisne and Condéare were destroyed and the Vauxaillon and Vierzy tunnels are blocked. On September 9, the presence of white cuirassiers 4th  corps commanded by General Alvensleben is reported in the district of Soissons. The Germans sent their troops to the Wailly bridge was it was not yet destroyed.

The Fortifications
Located at the junction of major roads and railways from Paris to Reims, as well as that of Paris to Laon by Villers-Cotterets, its location was considered important. However, the mountains which dominated the city being devoid of fortified works, make it a real bottom of a basin, a real shell nest.

The fortifications of Soissons consisted of a continuous wall covered with 11 bastions. This enclosure was casemated in various places, but not enough to shelter the garrison. It was based on the Aisne to the North and to the South and it formed a quadrilateral of approximately 1,200 meters by 800 meters. The Saint-Vaast suburb was not included in this quadrilateral, but also formed an enclosure also leaning on the Aisne, to the east, and was covered with 3 bastions .
A military dam, built on the river, near and upstream of the stone bridge, and a diversion from the Depression, allowed most of the ditches to be submerged and the bottom of the two valleys to be flooded.
Only a portion of the ditches, that of the southwest, because of its higher position, couldn't be flooded. With the exception of this point, the place of Soissons could not be taken by force, but it was unable to withstand a siege in a good condition for long.

On the eve of the war, Soissons was considered the key to Paris, but nothing had been done to put this stronghold in the state of the strategic importance attributed to it.

The Garrison
At the time of the declaration of war , the garrison of Soissons consisted of 3 battalions of the 15th line infantry regiment, under the orders of Colonel Théodore Eugène Fraboulet de Kerléadec. There were, however, no artillerymen or artillery teams.
On July 20, the 15th RIL left Soissons to join the Army of the Rhine.
The July 22 arrival of brigades spoiler Sonnay and Colin of 3 E Division 6 th Army Corps of the Army of the Rhineunder the orders of General Lafond de Villiers who joined theAugust 2ndthe Châlons camp.
From August 2 to 10 the place is absolutely without garrison.
On August 11, under the Decree of July 17, 1870 which called the mobile guards under the flags, the 2nd mobile battalion of the Aisne ( district of Soissons ) garrisoned there.
On August 12, arrival of 1st Battalion of mobile Aisne (district of Château-Thierry)
On August 17, arrives 6 th battalion of mobile Aisne (district of Vervins)
At about the same date, the depot battalion of the 15th line infantry regimentarrived from Laon. This was made up of 2 companies of 800 men each with barely 10 officers to command them. They were reinforced by elements escaped from Sedan which formed 2 additional companies.
The August 20 arriving from the 1st battery of the 8th artillery regiment .
On August 27, starting from 1st battalion of mobile Aisne for Villers-Cotterets and Paris 
That same day, the government recalled former soldiers aged 25 to 35, who were armed with old piston rifles, and created the rural national guards. These were transformed into marching regiments. Thus the 2 battalions of Soissons formed the 17th marching regiment .

At the start of the siege the city was defended by 4,425 men:

1 engineering section of Exéa's division (30 men)
1 battery piece of the 8th artillery regiment (115 men)
Northern Mobile Artillery (230 men)
12th North Mobile Artillery Battery
13th North Mobile Artillery Battery
16th North Mobile Artillery Battery
Soissonnais volunteer battery (50 men)
Deposit Company of the 15th Line Infantry Regiment
2nd Battalion mobile Aisne (1 200 men
6th battalion of mobile Aisne (1 200 men
With the total workforce about 550 men:

1 company of firefighters
1 company of volunteer national guards
About 15 gendarmes
122 artillery pieces of which 51 really usable.
It was this improvised troop, under the command of Lieutenant-Colonel de Noue, made up largely of volunteers who lacked everything (armament, equipment, instruction, discipline), and whose officers, non-commissioned officers and corporals appointed to haste without prior choice, having no notion of the profession of soldier, but who were of an unfailing good will who were responsible for defending this stronghold.

The siege

Prelude
Ignoring the city, the German army continued its march towards Paris, walking through the local roads of the region, leaving aside the obstacles which it did not want to seize until later in order not to slow down its march. This march made the trip faster since, from Sedan to Paris, the Germans did not meet any French soldiers, only two fortified towns were on their way, Laon and Soissons.

September
The city of Laon, commanded by General Thémérin, had for a garrison of only a battalion and a battery of artillery of the mobile guard. However, on September 8, a strong detonation coming from the direction of Laon had been heard in Soissons. It was the powder keg that had blown. At September 10, a parliamentary dragoon officer of the 12th army corps, looked at the Porte Saint-Martin to request the surrender of the place. Colonel de Noue, commander of the place, categorically refused. The long German columns continued to march around Soissons towards Paris and the city was thus surrounded. On September 14, a group of German cavalrymen attempted a reconnaissance on the Porte de Reims. They are driven out by cannon and rifle fire. The same day a second parliamentarian demanded the surrender of the place. In response to a new refusal, the Germans fired 3 cannon shots on the city from the heights of Sainte-Geneviève. On September 18, warned by an inhabitant, a platoon of national guards in Venizel were surprised. On the same day, a detachment of about twenty Prussians were dispatched; one was killed, the others are taken prisoner. On September 22, 42 national guards carried out a coup de main against some German riders accompanying about sixty horses confined to Beugneux ; 1 officer and 2 German soldiers were killed, 18 were taken prisoner and 50 horses captured.

On September 24, 40 National Guards and 15th line fire on the Prussian cavalry in The Cottage in Venizel. Alerted, a Prussian battalion, soon joined by 3 battalions of the landwehr, force the National Guards to fall back after a hard fight on the hill of Villeneuve. The French lost 2 officers, 8 wounded and 16 missing and the Prussians 2 dead and 15 wounded. Following this engagement, the Grand Duke of Mecklenburg, Frederick Francis II of Mecklenburg-Schwerin, sent the following telegram from Reims to the Ministry of War in Berlin:

“On Saturday, we had a serious engagement under the walls of Soissons, after a four-hour fight, we forced the enemy to return to the city after having suffered great losses, the commander of the place asked for an armistice for bury his dead, we refused him. Signed: Duke Mecklenburg ” .

A parliamentarian again summoned Colonel de Noue to give him back the city, and faced with a new refusal, the German troops made their arrangements to completely invest the place, by installing grand guard positions, by positioning battalions, mainly, on the Sainte-Geneviève plateau, in Billy-sur-Aisne and Venizel and by building shelters and defense works.

From September 25, the Prussian positions were bombarded by the French cannons. However, this did not prevent the Prussians from extending their supply lines and managed to occupy the station, which had been abandoned by the French which was Belleu , the left bank of the Crisis as far as Vauxbuin. and Presle. On September 26, 200 men of the 15th line accompanied by 100 men of 2 e Battalion mobile Aisne, went out to chase the Prussians in the suburb of Reims and burn their shelters. Unable to flush out the Germans, the attackers returned to the square after losing 2 dead and 2 wounded while the enemy lost 8 men. On September 27, fire was set in the foundry and part of the houses in the Faubourg Saint-Crépin in order to dislodge and drive away the Germans who were too close to the city walls, while many soldiers who had escaped from Sedan still arrived in the place. On September 28, the garrison tried to occupy the suburb of Reims and the station which was stopped by the Prussians after 2 hours of fighting.

October
On October 1, Lieutenant-General von Selchow arrived in front of Soissons to lead the siege, with reinforcements made up of 7 infantry battalions, 4 cavalry squadrons, 2 field artillery batteries and 2 pioneer companies. He established his headquarters at Carrière-l'Évêque located behind Belleu and on the hill. He extended and reinforced the line of investment on the left bank of the Aisne and brought it as close as possible to the French outposts. The Maison-Rouge farm was occupied as well as the cemetery blocking the road to Compiègne through which the French troops had been able to leave until then. The right bank was occupied by 2 companies of landwehrand a squadron of white cuirassiers. The infantry positioned themselves at Crouy and at Clémencin and behind the Laon railway embankment and the cavalry at La Perrière in order to monitor the roads to Chauny and Laon. On October 3, a food convoy made up of 18 cars managed to enter the square after the French troops stationed in Soissons had opened the passage to Crouy:

"To ensure the entry of supplies, Colonel Carpentier left with 6 companies taken in the two battalions of the mobile guard, and moved to the heights of Vauxrot. After having made the position clear and having settled down, he directed a company on Terny which brought the convoy into the place. To make the move, and clear the road of Laon, Ballet captain came out with 3 companies of the 15 th line . Lieutenant Ferté of the 1re company is focused on the farm St. Paul, Lieutenant Garnier of 2 th company on Clamecy Captain Felon, recruitment of the Aisne, with 3 e company supported this offensive movement, which took place with a remarkable whole. The enemy flushed out by a very strong fire, withdrew in disorder on the village of Crouy, pursued by about twenty skirmishers who took 6 prisoners, including 1 wounded. Our soldiers then occupied the ridges of the railroad embankment until they arrived in town. The losses are 1 killed and 3 wounded. Soissons on October 3, 1870. Signed De Noue, commandant of the place."

On October 5, by order of Colonel de Noue, the Vailly bridge was destroyed. “By order of the superior commander, the Vailly bridge must be destroyed. The guardian of the bridge, under penalty of treason, will have to let the order be carried out, if he warns the enemy, he will be brought before a council of war and shot. Soissons October 4, 1870. Signed De Noue. "

On October 6, informed of the destruction of the bridge, a detachment of around forty German cavalrymen entered Vailly and proceeded to arrest the mayor M. Mennessier and the councilor general of the canton M. Legry who were accused of "act Criminal expected and punished by the 4 th paragraph of the Royal Order of 21 July 1867 and the rescript of paragraph 18 of the military Penal Code " The Prussians were taken to the Carrière-l'Evêque where General de Selchow had his headquarters who rendered the following judgment:

“The town of Vailly will pay 20,000 francs as a fine for the act of hostility committed on its territory; one of the two prisoners will go to Vailly to get the money, the other will stay until his return, which will take place today."

From October 7 to October 11 the clashes continued: the besieged carried out harassment and bombing of outposts, while the besiegers, numbering 6,000 infantry, tightened their grip around the square:

On the left bank of the Aisne, from Venizel to the Crisis, 3 battalions and 1 light battery at the Château de Bellevue and at the Sainte-Geneviève farm, with the HQ in Billy-sur-Aisne. From the left bank of the Crisis to the Aisne, 3 battalions and 2 squadrons, with HQ in Vauxbuin. On the right bank of the Aisne, 1 battalion, 1 squadron and 1 battery, with the HQ at Ferme de la Perrière . A strong barricade, built by the Germans, cut off the road to Chauny, in anticipation of an exit of the besieged to the North. The line of outposts on the left bank started from the railway bridge near Villeneuve, followed the railway through the already dug trench to the station, then behind and after the Faubourg de la Crise, then passed in front of the mill of Buerie, the farms of Presle, Maupas and the Maison-Rouge on the road to Compiègne. The Germans built batteries to receive siege guns on October 12, the German artillery opened fire on Soissons. It was made up of:

4 fortress artillery companies (480 men)
2 reserve field batteries (320 men)
10 x 150 steel cannons
16 guns of 120 in bronze
6 guns of 90 (field artillery)
6 x 80 guns (field artillery)
2 mortars of 270 (taken in Toul or Marsal )
4 mortars of 220 (taken in Toul or Marsal)
4 mortars of 150 (taken in Toul or Marsal)
To which were added:

9 infantry battalions (7,200 men)
4 large cavalry squadrons (500 men)
2 pioneer companies (600 men)
The first shells fell on the front 3–4, the cavalier 27 and the arsenal.

All morning of October 12, the continuous cannonade of 73 German pieces shook the ground, destroyed houses, started fires and caused considerable damage and loss of life, despite the obstinacy with which the defenders responded, until the end of the day. On that day the Germans sent 1,864 shells, 184 shrapnels and 300 bombs.

On October 13, the cannonade was even more violent and many projectiles fell on the large barracks but also on a large number of houses causing new fires. At the beginning of the afternoon, a German parliamentarian appeared before Colonel de Noue who replied:

"That his duty and his honor did not allow him to capitulate, that the garrison was intact and ready to fight, that the pieces were recovered and ready to fire and that he was waiting for the Germans to assault the breach; he complained bitterly to the parliamentarian that the Germans were shooting at the city and the ambulances, although they were protected by the flag of the Geneva Convention, and that the siege was conducted in an inhuman manner since the fire was directed as much on the city as on the ramparts."

It was the fourth time that Colonel de Noue refused to surrender. The bombardment of the city resumed with a vengeance and with increased intensity. The Grand-Hôpital, which gave asylum to 300 people, caught fire under repeated blows from German artillery. The blows dealt by the besieger in this second day of bombardment were serious. On that day the Germans sent 1,993 shells, 225 shrapnels and 294 bombs.

On October 14, the human losses were less important; however the barracks, bastions numbered 3, 4, and 5 suffered heavy damage as well as the northern part of the fortifications whose German guns had breached from 33 to 35 meters and where an assault was now feared. Numerous letters addressed by the inhabitants of Soissons asked Colonel de Noue to stop this siege and to capitulate in order to put an end to the destruction, disasters, fires and victims. Mayor Henri Salleron also protested Lieutenant-Colonel de Noue against the bombardment:

"We should have expected," said the members of the municipal commission, "to endure a regular siege, but we should not believe that fifty hours of bombardment, with formidable devices, on positions which command the city on all sides, had to surrender almost useless any regular defense and wipe out much of the city, ” which went unanswered. These letters remained without effect.

On October 15, Henri Salleron sent a new missive to the military commander, giving a full account of the situation:

“Ruin, death and famine, this is the fate no longer of a third of the population but of more than half; only two districts are privileged until this hour: those surrounding the Place d'Armes and the Town Hall and most of the Faubourg Saint-Waast. Services of any kind become impossible; we can no longer even bury the dead and we no longer want to go get our bread. The inhabitants who have a habitable cellar, can remain locked there and put their existence in the shelter, but half of the population is obliged to await death in the houses, and if one bombed the suburb, it does not there is not a cellar that is not flooded, so no refuge. Besides, Colonel, I don't want to try to move you; I fully share your thoughts on the sacrifices imposed by patriotism, I appeal only to reason and, no more than you, I am not prepared to compromise with the enemy. Only, I understand all the possible sacrifices, life and fortune, only on condition of believing them useful. God knows if the present situation has not covered your military responsibility since yesterday. I had, not without difficulty, opened ditches at the place indicated, but, at two feet, we encountered water. As there are deaths of five days, I took it upon myself to have pits opened in the Jeu de Paume. (At the foot of the curtain wall 8–9, the corpses were brought in dumpers, 47 dead were thus buried and later transported to the city cemetery) I am not prepared to compromise with the enemy any more than you are. Only, I understand all the possible sacrifices, life and fortune, only on condition of believing them useful. God knows if the present situation has not covered your military responsibility since yesterday. I had, not without difficulty, opened ditches at the place indicated, but, at two feet, we encountered water. As there are deaths of five days, I took it upon myself to have pits opened in the Jeu de Paume (At the foot of the curtain wall 8–9, the corpses were brought in dumpers, 47 dead were thus buried and later transported to the city cemetery) "I am not prepared to compromise with the enemy any more than you are. Only, I understand all the possible sacrifices, life and fortune, only on condition of believing them useful. God knows if the present situation has not covered your military responsibility since yesterday. I had, not without difficulty, opened ditches at the place indicated, but, at two feet, we encountered water. As there are deaths of five days, I took it upon myself to have pits opened in the Jeu de Paume (At the foot of the curtain wall 8-9, the corpses were brought in dumpers, 47 dead were thus buried and later transported to the city cemetery) on the condition of believing them useful. God knows if the present situation has not covered your military responsibility since yesterday. I had, not without difficulty, opened ditches at the place indicated, but, at two feet, we encountered water. As there are deaths of five days, I took it upon myself to have pits opened in the Jeu de Paume (At the foot of the curtain wall 8-9, the corpses were brought in dumpers, 47 dead were thus buried and later transported to the city cemetery) " on the condition of believing them useful. God knows if the present situation has not covered your military responsibility since yesterday. I had, not without difficulty, opened ditches at the place indicated, but, at two feet, we encountered water. As there are deaths of five days, I took it upon myself to have pits opened in the Jeu de Paume (At the foot of the curtain wall 8–9, the corpses were brought in dumpers, 47 dead were thus buried and later transported to the city cemetery)".

In the afternoon, not having succeeded in deciding Colonel de Noue, Henri Salleron completed his presentation: “It is certain that you are unaware of the material state of our Hôtel-Dieu and our ambulances. If you want to visit them, you will see the most awful sight. 500 sick and wounded, threatened with asphyxiation in the cellars, are piled up on top of each other; in the corners, children and old people; more supplies following the hospital fire. In Saint-Léger, 150 wounded or sick piled up in the crypt. Since morning, I have been trying to accommodate the families driven from their homes by the fire and the destruction. I did what I could, but I won't find any more asylum. The fires continue, and I believe that no city has endured so much ruin and misery with more resignation. Up to you to enjoy."

Lieutenant-Colonel de Noue did not see the assistance arriving which he had had requested in Lille by Lieutenant-Colonel Carpentier, in the presence of the strong requests addressed to him, and of the almost desperate situation in which the place found itself. found, decided to consult the members of the Defense Council on the course to be taken, inviting them to each give their opinion, either for resistance or for capitulation. This meeting of the Defense Council was quite eventful and above all very painful for the local commander. Knowing that a long resistance was not possible and that new sacrifices were completely useless, Colonel de Noue decided to spare the city new ruins and the defense of new victims and resigned himself to propose to the besiegers the surrender of the city.

On October 16, at around 2 a.m., Colonel von Krensky carried the protocol of surrender:
"1- Colonel von Krensky, Chief of Staff of 13 th army corps, charged the full powers of his Royal Highness the Grand Duke of Mecklenburg
2 - Lieutenant-Colonel de Noue, commander of the Place de Soissons.
Article 1: The Place de Soissons with all the material it contains will be made available to HRH the Grand Duke of Mecklenburg.
Article 2: The garrison of Soissons, comprising all the men who bore arms during the defense, whether in uniform or not, is a prisoner of war, are excepted from this article the national guards and the mobile guards who lived in the city before war was declared.
Article 3: In consideration of the valiant defense of the place, all officers and senior employees with officer rank, who will undertake in writing their word of honor to no longer bear arms against Germany, nor to act in nothing against his interests during the current war, will be released. Those who agree to these conditions will keep their weapons, their horses, their effects and their servants.
Article 4: Tomorrow, at two o'clock, the garrison, unarmed, will be led to the glacis of the Porte de Reims.
Article 5: The war material, including flags, cannons, arms, horses, caissons, ammunition, etc., etc., will be delivered at three o'clock by the heads of departments to a Prussian commission.
Article 6: All the military doctors will stay to treat the wounded.
Article 7: In consideration of what the city has suffered, it will not suffer any other contribution than that of feeding the garrison, after exhaustion of the supplies left in the state stores.
Done at Soissons, at eleven o'clock in the evening, on October 15, 1870.
Signed: von Krensky and de Noue "

The End of the Siege
The municipal commission, informed by the local commander, had the following notice posted in town, which informed the inhabitants of the capitulation of Soissons:

“The Municipal Commission was informed this morning, October 16, by the Commandant of Place de Soissons that, after hearing the Defense Council, and taking into consideration the suffering of the city, he had to sign the surrender of the square, which will be handed over to the Prussian authorities today at two o'clock; and, as regards the city that, according to an article of the convention, it will not have to undergo any war remuneration than that of feeding the garrison, after the exhaustion of the provisions left in the stores of the 'State. The members of the Municipal Commission recommend to their fellow citizens the attitude and calm demanded by the sad necessities of the situation.”

Under the pretext that they did not want to leave anything to the Germans, the soldiers stormed the state stores and turned them over to plunder; a certain number went to the reserves of wine and brandy. In the work of the German General Staff we find the following passage: “In the afternoon of the 16th, the prisoner garrison, approximately 4,800 men strong, left by the Porte de Reims, drunk for the most part and in quite a mess.”

The 2nd and 6th battalions of Aisne Mobile were reviewed by a German officer, who went free after giving them knowledge of the article on the act of surrender, and have meant that they were no longer to serve against Germany during this war. What was noteworthy was that almost all the men of these battalions, once free hastened to reach the North and enlist to fight the invaders. The soldiers passed in front of the German troops lined up in line on the avenue de la Gare and left for Germany by the road to Chateau-Thierry, under the leadership of the landwehr battalion of Jüterbogk and a squadron of cavalry. The Prussians, as soon as the last prisoner had passed, began the procession for the entry into the town with all their troops.

The convoy of prisoners was advancing towards Oulchy-le-Château, which is where they spend the night. Crossing into Saint-Jean-aux-Bois, which was located between Hartennes and Oulchy, and the darkness being almost complete, the escape plans made at the start were carried out. At the signal, men rushed into the woods and disappeared. The Prussian soldiers forming the hedge fired, several prisoners fell. The front and rear platoons, believing in an attack by the snipers, also fired without realizing exactly what was happening and shot each other. A general panic ensued, thanks to which some 600 prisoners escaped. The prisoners then passed by rail from Château-Thierry to Bar-le-Duc then Lunéville and arrived in Cologne which was their place of internment, on October 20 in the evening.

Aftermath
The yoke of the Prussian occupation then weighed heavily on the city of Soissons for 12 months.

After the war, a council of inquiry, appointed by the French Government, was charged, under the presidency of Marshal Baraguay-d'Hilliers , to examine the capitulations of the strongholds which succumbed to the attacks of the Germans.
Below is the extract from the minutes of the meeting of November 13, 1871 relating to the surrender of Soissons:

" The board,
Having regard to the file relating to the surrender of the Place de Soissons;
Considering the text of the capitulation;
On the report that was made to him;
Ouï M. de Noue, lieutenant-colonel, commander of the place of Soissons;
M. Mosbach, battalion commander, engineer commander; Mr. Roques-Salvaza, squadron leader, commanding the artillery; M. Denis, major of the 15th of the line, and M. Fargeon, captain of engineers, employed at Soissons during the siege.
Considering that although Lieutenant-Colonel de Noue, commanding the Place de Soissons, showed activity in the provision of food, he did not deploy enough severity to maintain discipline in the troops placed under his control. orders. That he lacked foresight by authorizing several chefs de corps to be absent when the place could be taken over, and thereby harmed discipline and esprit de corps.
Considering that if the body of the place has been breached; the breach was not practicable; that if the artillery had suffered, it could still continue the defense; that the ammunition for food and war was abundant; that the losses of the garrison were relatively small; that the commander of the place is to blame for having capitulated without having pinned his guns, destroyed his powders and his provisions, and, on the contrary, undertook to deliver them to the enemy;
Considering that the place was returned in spite of the opinion of the commander of the 15th of line and that of the commander of the engineers, and that, far from rallying to this opinion, the lieutenant-colonel de Noue, contrary to article 156 of the decree on the service of the places, knew how to impose its will only for the capitulation;
Considering that he breached the prescriptions of the same article, by stipulating that the officers who gave their word not to serve against Germany, would be set free and that they would keep arms, horses and baggage, while he was to stipulate that in favor of the wounded and sick;
Is of the opinion:
That Lieutenant-Colonel de Noue has revealed a deep incapacity and a great weakness, and that he seems to the Council unfit to exercise a command.
For compliant extract,
The Chairman of the Board of Inquiry,
Signed: Baraguay-d'Hilliers ”.

In 1885, the city of Soissons was declassified mainly because of the considerable extension of its defense system, the cost of the expenses incurred for this defensive reorganization as well as the secondary role now devolved to the place. So at March 5, 1885, the city of Soissons was removed from the classification table of places of war.

References

Bibliography
D Vincent: Souvenir of a soldier from 1870. Siege of Soissons
René Fossé d'Arcosse: The siege of Soissons in 1870
Émile Collet: The siege of Soissons and the German occupation in the Soissonnais 1870-1871

1870 in France
Soissons
Soissons
Soissons
Soissons
September 1870 events
October 1870 events